Marian columns are religious monuments depicting Virgin Mary on the top, often built in thanksgiving for the ending of a plague (plague columns) or for some other reason. The purpose of the Holy Trinity columns was usually simply to celebrate the church and the faith, though the plague motif could sometimes play its role in their erection as well. Erecting religious monuments in the form of a column surmounted by a figure or a Christian symbol was a gesture of public faith that flourished in the Catholic countries of Europe especially in the 17th and 18th centuries. Thus they became one of the most visible features of Baroque architecture. This usage also influenced some Eastern Orthodox Baroque architecture.

Other subjects
Although plague columns are most commonly dedicated to the Virgin Mary, some depict other saints. A typical one is St. Roch, who is said to have fallen ill when helping the sick during an epidemic of plague and who recovered through the strength of his faith. St. Sebastian, a martyr whose statue also often decorates these structures, was originally the patron of archers. In the Middle Ages Sebastian took the place of the plague-dealing archer Apollo, as people sometimes metaphorically compared the random nature of plague to random shots of archers, and thus he started being connected with the plague too. Other frequently depicted saints are St. Barbara, a patron of the dying, and two more recent and historical saints: St. Francis Xavier, who, according to the legend, raised people from the dead, and St. Charles Borromeo, known for working among the sick and the dying.

History

In Imperial Rome, it was the practice to erect a statue of the Emperor atop a column. The last such a column was the Column of Phocas, erected in the Roman Forum and dedicated or rededicated in 608. The Christian practice of erecting a column topped with a statue of the Virgin Mary dates back at least to the 10th century (in Clermont-Ferrand in France), but it became common especially in the Counter-Reformation period following the Council of Trent (1545–1563). The column in Piazza Santa Maria Maggiore in Rome was one of the first. The column itself was ancient: it had supported the vault of the so-called Basilica of Constantine in Rome, destroyed by an earthquake in the 9th century. By the 17th century only this column survived; in 1614 it was transported to Piazza Santa Maria Maggiore and crowned with a bronze statue of the Virgin and Child. Within decades it served as a model for many columns in Italy and other European countries.

The first column of this type north of the Alps was the Mariensäule built in Munich in 1638 to celebrate the sparing of the city from both the invading Swedish army and the plague. The Virgin Mary is standing on its top on a crescent moon as the Queen of Heaven. It inspired for example Marian columns in Prague  and Vienna, but many others also followed very quickly. In the countries which used to belong to the Habsburg monarchy (especially Austria, Hungary, the Czech Republic, and Slovakia) it is quite exceptional to find an old town square without such a column, usually located in the most prominent place.

The Prague column was built in Old Town Square shortly after the Thirty Years' War in thanksgiving to the Virgin Mary Immaculate for helping in the fight with the Swedes. At noon its shadow indicated the so-called Prague Meridian, which was used to check the exact solar time. Some Czechs  connected its placement and erection with the hegemony of the Habsburgs in their country, and after declaring the independence of Czechoslovakia in 1918 a crowd of people pulled this old monument down and destroyed it in an excess of revolutionary fervor. The column was rebuilt in 2020.

The basic model which inspired building most Holy Trinity columns is the Pestsäule or Dreifaltigkeitssäule ("Plague" or "Holy Trinity column") in the Grabenplatz, Vienna, built after the 1679 plague; in this monument the column has entirely disappeared in marble clouds and colossal saints, angels and putti. The era of these religious structures culminated with the outstanding Holy Trinity Column in Horní Square in Olomouc. This monument, built shortly after the plague which struck Moravia (nowadays in the Czech Republic) between 1714 and 1716, was exceptional because of its monumentality, rich decoration and unusual combination of sculptural material (stone and gilded copper). Its base was made so big that even a chapel was hidden inside. This column is the only one which has been individually inscribed on the UNESCO World Heritage List as "one of the most exceptional examples of the apogee of central European Baroque artistic expression".

See also
 Holy Trinity Column, Malá Strana
 Plague cross
 Solomonic column
 Spires of Naples

References

External links

Our Lady and the Column
The Plague Column in Vienna A video of the column
The column at Basilica di Santa Maria Maggiore
Holy Trinity Column in Olomouc — pictures
Holy Trinity Column in Olomouc — UNESCO World Heritage
Povídání o morových sloupech 

 
17th-century architecture
17th-century Catholicism
18th-century architecture
18th-century Catholicism
Baroque architectural features
Second plague pandemic